The 1926 Michigan State Spartans football team represented Michigan State College as an independent during the 1926 college football season. In their fourth year under head coach Ralph H. Young, the Spartans compiled a 3–4–1 record and were outscored by their opponents 171 to 97.

Schedule

Game summaries

Michigan
On October 9, 1926, Michigan State lost to Michigan by a 55–3 score.

References

Michigan State
Michigan State Spartans football seasons
Michigan State Spartans football